This is a List of Flags used in Libya. for more information about the national flag, see the Flag of Libya

National flag

Ethnic flags

Military flags

Historical flags

See also 

 Flag of Libya
 Coat of arms of Libya

References 

Lists and galleries of flags
Flags